Battle of Dogger Bank may refer:

Battle of Dogger Bank (1696), during the War of the Grand Alliance between a French squadron and a Dutch convoy
Battle of Dogger Bank (1781), during the Fourth Anglo-Dutch War between a British squadron and a Dutch squadron
Dogger Bank incident, a 1904 incident during the Russo-Japanese War, when Russian sailors wrongly opened fire on British fishing boats
Battle of Dogger Bank (1915), during World War I, between battlecruisers of the Royal Navy and the German Navy
Battle of Dogger Bank (1916), during World War I, between a mine-sweeping squadron of the Royal Navy and German torpedo boats